William Hayward Jr. (1787October 19, 1836) was an American politician.  Born at Shipshead, near Easton, Maryland, Hayward attended Easton Academy and graduated from Princeton College in 1808.  He studied law, was admitted to the bar in 1809, and commenced practice in Easton.  He served as a member of the Maryland House of Delegates from 1818 to 1820, and was elected as a Crawford Republican to the Eighteenth Congress from the seventh congressional district of Maryland.  He served one term from March 4, 1823, to March 3, 1825.  Afterwards, he continued the practice of law in Easton until his death there.  He is interred in the family burial ground on his estate, Shipshead.

References

1787 births
1836 deaths
Members of the Maryland House of Delegates
Princeton University alumni
People from Talbot County, Maryland
Democratic-Republican Party members of the United States House of Representatives from Maryland
19th-century American politicians